Tapinella atrotomentosa, commonly known as the velvet roll-rim or velvet-footed pax, is a species of fungus in the family Tapinellaceae. Although it has gills, it is a member of the pored mushroom order Boletales. August Batsch described the species in 1783. It has been recorded from Asia, Central America, Europe and North America. Tough and inedible, it grows on tree stumps of conifers. The mushroom contains several compounds that act as deterrents of feeding by insects.

Taxonomy
Tapinella atrotomentosa was originally described as  Agaricus atrotomentosus by German naturalist August Batsch in his 1783 work Elenchus Fungorum, and given its current name by Josef Šutara in 1992. It is commonly known as the "velvet-footed pax", and the "velvet rollrim". Historical synonyms include Paxillus atrotomentosus by Elias Magnus Fries (1833), Rhymovis atrotomentosa by Gottlob Ludwig Rabenhorst (1844), and Sarcopaxillus atrotomentosus by Ivan Zmitrovich (2004). The variety bambusinus was described from Trinidad in 1951 by British mycologists Richard Eric Defoe Baker and William Thomas Dale.

The species name is derived from the Latin words atrotomentosus, meaning "black-haired". It is still commonly seen under its old name Paxillus atrotomentosus in guidebooks. Tapinella atrotomentosa and its relative T. panuoides were placed in a separate genus Tapinella on account of their habit of growing on (and rotting) wood, and microscopic differences including much smaller spore size, lack of cystidia, and differing basidia. Their off-centre stipe also distinguished them from other members of the genus Paxillus, and genetic analysis confirmed them as only distantly related.

Description
The stem is covered with dark brown or black velvety fur. The gills are cream-yellow and forked, while the thick stipe is dark brown and juts out sidewards from the mushroom. The flesh is yellowish, and has been described as appetising in appearance, and is little affected by insects; the taste however is acrid. The spore print is yellow and the spores are round to oval and measure 5-6 μm long.

Distribution and habitat
It is a saprobic fungus found growing on tree stumps of conifers in North America, Europe, Central America (Costa Rica), east into Asia where it has been recorded from Pakistan and China. The fruit bodies appear in summer and autumn, even in drier spells when other mushrooms are not evident.

Toxicity
The species contains toxins which may cause gastrointestinal upset. There have been cases of poisoning reported in European literature.

Although Tapinella atrotomentosa mushrooms are not generally considered edible, they have been used as a food source in parts of eastern Europe. Tests on the chemical composition and free amino acid levels of the mushroom suggest that they are not considerably different from other edible gilled mushrooms such as Armillaria mellea. Linus Zeitlmayr reports that young mushrooms are edible, but warns than older ones have a foul bitter or inky flavour and are possibly poisonous. The bitter flavour is allegedly improved by boiling the mushrooms and discarding the water, but is indigestible to many.

Chemistry
Tapinella atrotomentosa has a wound-activated defence mechanism whereby injured fruit bodies convert chemicals known as leucomentins into atromentin, butenolide, and the feeding deterrent osmundalactone. Atromentin had previously been identified as the pigment producing the brown colour of the cap, but was not characterized as a chemical defence compound until 1989.  Other compounds produced by the fungus include the orange-yellow flavomentins and violet spiromentin pigments. A novel dimeric lactone, bis-osumundalactone, was isolated from the variety bambusinus.

Several phytoecdysteroids (compounds related to the insect moulting hormone ecdysteroid) have been identified from the fungus, including paxillosterone, 20,22-p-hydroxybenzylidene acetal, atrotosterones A, B, and C, and 25-hydroxyatrotosterones A and B.

References

External links

Boletales
Fungi of Asia
Fungi of Central America
Fungi of Europe
Fungi of North America
Inedible fungi
Fungi described in 1783
Taxa named by August Batsch